Dewi Safitri (born 10 February 1993) is an Indonesian weightlifter, competing in the 53 kg category and representing Indonesia at international competitions. 

She competed at world championships, including at the 2015 World Weightlifting Championships, and the 2016 Summer Olympics.

Major results

References

External links
 

1993 births
Living people
People from Bekasi
Sportspeople from West Java
Indonesian female weightlifters
Weightlifters at the 2010 Summer Youth Olympics
Weightlifters at the 2016 Summer Olympics
Olympic weightlifters of Indonesia
21st-century Indonesian women